Blind Alleys is a 1927 American silent romantic drama film directed by Frank Tuttle and starring Thomas Meighan and Evelyn Brent.

Cast
 Thomas Meighan as Captain Dan Kirby
 Evelyn Brent as Sally Ray
 Greta Nissen as Maria d'Alvarez Kirby
 Hugh Miller as Julio Lachados
 Thomas Chalmers as Dr. Webster
 Tammany Young as Gang Leader

References

External links

Stills at silenthollywood.com

1927 films
1927 romantic drama films
American romantic drama films
American silent feature films
American black-and-white films
Famous Players-Lasky films
Films directed by Frank Tuttle
Paramount Pictures films
1920s English-language films
1920s American films
Silent romantic drama films
Silent American drama films